People v. Dlugash (1977) was a pivotal decision from the Court of Appeals of New York involving the principle of attempt in criminal law. It established that "legal impossibility," where one or more legal elements of a crime cannot be met, is not a defense for an attempt charge. This revolutionized the way New York courts analyze attempt, by shifting the focus from external circumstances to the state of mind of the defendant. The court looked to the Model Penal Code (MPC) for guidance in writing this decision, and recognized the MPC's goal of eliminating all types of impossibility as a defense for attempt.

The defendant, Melvin Dlugash, shot a dead body and was charged with attempted murder, a crime that was legally impossible to commit. Dlugash allegedly shot the dead body out of fear, and with the hope of placating the actual killer by showing solidarity. Despite this, the jury believed that Dlugash intended to kill the victim, so the Court of Appeals of New York upheld an attempted murder conviction.

References 

New York (state) state case law
1977 in United States case law
U.S. state criminal case law